Satellite News Channel (SNC) was an American short-lived news-based cable television channel that was operated as a joint venture between the ABC Video Enterprises division of American Broadcasting Companies, Inc. (a.k.a. ABC) and the Group W Satellite Communications subsidiary of Westinghouse Broadcasting Company (a.k.a. Group W). Designed as a satellite-delivered cable network, the channel is best remembered as the first 24-hour news cable competition to the Cable News Network (CNN). SNC's headquarters were based in the New York City suburb of Stamford, Connecticut.

The channel's format consisted of 18-minute-long rotating newscasts with the remaining time in each half-hour block allocated for a regional news summary; this lent credence to SNC's slogan, "Give us 18 minutes, we'll give you the world," which was derived through Group W's experience in all-news radio. Each 18-minute national newscast featured content gathered from both in-house newsgathering and reporting staffs and reports sourced from international television networks that maintained content agreements with ABC/Group W to supply stories for the channel. The regional summaries were sectioned by "zones", and often originated from either ABC affiliates (such as KOMO-TV in Seattle) or Group W stations (such as KDKA-TV in Pittsburgh).

History
ABC Video Enterprises and Group W Satellite Communications announced the formation of the Satellite News Channel on August 12, 1981, with a tentative launch set for early 1982. CNN founder Ted Turner subsequently announced plans to launch a spin-off service, CNN2 (later renamed CNN Headline News shortly after SNC's launch; it is now named HLN), which originally maintained a format similar to that being planned by the Satellite News Channel – albeit with newscasts running in 30-minute intervals – as a preemptive strike against the ABC/Group W venture. CNN2 made its launch on January 1, 1982 on participating cable systems across the county as well as through a sneak preview block on sister channel Superstation WTBS.

Satellite News Channel launched on June 21, 1982. During that time, it provided competition for CNN, the first cable network to do so at the time. The network utilized footage from ABC News for its reports and maintained seven newsgathering and reporting crews based in Washington, D.C. At launch, Satellite News Channel compensated participating cable operators to carry the channel, contrary to the standard of the period in which cable channels charged a nominal fee per subscriber for carriage. Despite this model, SNC had difficulty obtaining clearance from cable systems. The network and its satellite transponder space was eventually purchased by CNN's corporate parent, the Turner Broadcasting System. Satellite News Channel ceased operations on October 27, 1983, after sixteen months on the air; most local cable systems replaced SNC with either CNN or, more commonly, CNN Headline News.

Notable staff

Reporters
Ken Alvord
Dan Breinholt
Lyn Brown
Charles Crawford
Amanda Davis
Solon Gray
Jose Grinan
Carol Iovanna
R.D. Sahl
Deborah Stone
Laurel Ornish
Jackson Bain

Field correspondents
Jon Bascom
Lou Cioffi
Andy Gastmeyer
Carolyn Gorman
Mike Ritz
Joe Sanchez
Steve Taylor

BusinessWeek
Kathleen Champion
Jeff Simmons

Meteorologists
Keith Eichner
Todd Gross
Alan Kasper
Jeff Pylant
Bob Richards
Arnie Rosen

Sportscasters
Jim Brinson
Dan Carney
Jim Donovan
Marc Goldberg
Frank Gorin
Larry Sacknoff
Dave Sims

Entertainment
Joe Ricci

Graphic Designers
Billy Sunshine
Cathe Ishino
Judy Rosenfeld
Daryl Deangelo
Janet Scabrini
Nat Zimmerman
Martin Hara
Robert E. Moran
Debra Klein
Maureen Nappi
Jan Helsel

After the closure – successor channels
For a brief time after SNC shut down, its theme music was used by fellow Connecticut cable network ESPN.

Starting in 1989, All News Channel (ANC) was an American satellite television news channel owned by CONUS Communications, a joint venture between Viacom and Hubbard Broadcasting. The channel was carried mainly on direct-broadcast satellite provider DirecTV (and prior to that, USSB, which was folded into DirecTV in 1999). All News Channel's programming was also syndicated to television stations across the United States. The channel was headquartered in St. Paul, Minnesota. The channel ceased broadcasting on September 30, 2002.

In 1996, ABC revealed plans to launch a 24-hour news channel but discontinued them after Fox News Channel and MSNBC were announced.

In 2004, ABC News returned to the 24-hour news market with ABC News Now. The channel began as a digital subchannel but was later moved to cable. However that channel like SNC received little cable and satellite carriage, only being available on regional cable systems and Sprint's mobile devices. After nine years in operation, it was shut down.

In 2013 ABC News partnered with Univision Communications to launch Fusion, a new cable news channel focused on a Hispanic audience with shows skewed to a younger demographic which also includes satire and entertainment programs. The channel went live on October 28, 2013. The channel is ABC's third attempt at a cable news channel and their second partnership on one, the first since SNC. As far as distribution, Fusion has fared much better in respects to carriage than its two predecessors, securing both major satellite carriers and major cable operators in markets like New York City. Although Fusion continues to exist, ABC News' parent company, the Walt Disney Company, sold its stake in Fusion to Univision. It has since been owned by the Fusion Media Group, which is a division of Univision.

See also 
 List of United States cable and satellite television networks
 Westinghouse Broadcasting

References

External links
 Satellite News Channel last day (part 1)
 Satellite News Channel last day (part 2)
 Satellite News Channel one year anniversary

ABC News
Westinghouse Broadcasting
Television channels and stations established in 1982
Television channels and stations disestablished in 1983
English-language television stations in the United States
Defunct television networks in the United States
Joint ventures